The Secret Diary of Adrian Mole, Aged 13¾ is the first book in the Adrian Mole series of comedic fiction, written by Sue Townsend. The book is written in a diary style, and focuses on the worries and regrets of a teenager who believes himself to be an intellectual. The story is set in 1981 and 1982, and in the background it refers to some of the historic world events of the time, such as the Falklands War and the wedding of Prince Charles and Lady Diana as well as the birth of Prince William. Mole is a fierce critic of prime minister Margaret Thatcher, listing her as one of his worst enemies.

Apart from the humorous events described in the diary, a lot of the book's humour originates from the unreliable narration of Mole, who naïvely, yet confidently,  misinterprets events around him.

The book was first published in hardcover by Methuen on 7 October 1982.  Sequels include (in chronological order):
The Growing Pains of Adrian Mole
The True Confessions of Adrian Albert Mole
Adrian Mole and the Small Amphibians (all of which were contained in Adrian Mole: From Minor to Major)
Adrian Mole: The Wilderness Years
Adrian Mole: The Cappuccino Years
Adrian Mole and the Weapons of Mass Destruction
Adrian Mole: The Prostrate Years

Reception
The book was a best-seller, and had sold 1.9 million copies by November 1985.

On 5 November 2019 BBC News included The Secret Diary of Adrian Mole, Aged 13¾ on its list of the 100 most influential novels.

Adaptations
A 7-part radio series on BBC Radio 4 featured extracts from the book read by Nicholas Barnes. Townsend adapted the book for the stage in 1984 with music by Ken Howard and Alan Blaikley. There was also a 1985 television series.

A successful stage production ran at the Wyndham's Theatre, London, in 1984-1986, that included Simon Gipps-Kent and followed with a road tour.

A stage musical adaptation by Jake Brunger and Pippa Cleary opened at Leicester's Curve Theatre in March 2015. Townsend had been working on the project at the time of her death in 2014.

References

1982 British novels
British young adult novels
Fictional diaries
Novels set in Leicestershire
Novels set in the 1980s
BILBY Award-winning works
Adrian Mole novels
Methuen Publishing books